The 1907 Stepney by-election was held on 10 May 1907.  The by-election was held due to the resignation of the incumbent Conservative MP, William Evans-Gordon.  It was won by the Conservative candidate Frederick Leverton Harris.

References

Stepney by-election
Stepney,1907
Stepney by-election
Stepney